The Ambassadors Theatre (formerly the New Ambassadors Theatre), is a West End theatre located in West Street, near Cambridge Circus on Charing Cross Road in the City of Westminster. It is one of the smallest of the West End theatres, seating a maximum of 444, with 195 people in the dress circle and 251 in the stalls.

History
The theatre was, along with the adjacent St Martin's conceived by their architect, W. G. R. Sprague, as companions, born at the same time in 1913, but the First World War interrupted the construction of the latter for three years. The Ambassadors was built with the intention of being an intimate, smaller theatre and is situated opposite the renowned restaurant The Ivy, favourite haunt of the theatrical elite.

The theatre was Grade II listed by English Heritage in March 1973.

New Ambassadors era
In 1996, the venue was bought by its namesake the Ambassador Theatre Group, now the largest operator of theatres in the West End. It was first split into two small spaces, by creating a false floor at circle level, and used by the Royal Court. Then in 1999 the venue was returned to its original design, renamed the New Ambassadors and hosted niche works and plays not normally seen outside of smaller fringe venues. However, within a few years the theatre had largely reverted to playing material seen as more commercially viable for its location in the West End.

On 4 April 2007 it was announced that ATG had sold the venue to Stephen Waley-Cohen, who renamed the venue The Ambassadors as it once was, and began an extensive programme of refurbishments. In 2014, Waley-Cohen announced plans to sell the Ambassadors to Delfont Mackintosh Theatres, who said it intended to rename the theatre after Stephen Sondheim once the sale was completed. The sale was later postponed pending redevelopment approval, and was ultimately cancelled in November 2018. In December 2018, Waley-Cohen instead sold the theatre back to ATG for £12 million, more than twice what Mackintosh was slated to pay.

Productions 
Vivien Leigh made her West End debut in the Ambassadors, starring in The Mask of Virtue (1935); this was the play in which Laurence Olivier first saw her perform.

The theatre's most famous production is Agatha Christie's The Mousetrap, which showed from 1952 to 1974 before moving next door to the St Martin's Theatre, where it is still running.

After its purchase by the Ambassador Theatre Group under producer Sonia Friedman, productions included Some Explicit Polaroids by Mark Ravenhill, Spoonface Steinberg by Lee Hall, Krapp's Last Tape by Samuel Beckett and starring John Hurt, and was the West End's first home of Marie Jones' Stones in His Pockets and The Vagina Monologues by Eve Ensler.

Recent productions have included the multi-award-winning production of John Doyle's Sweeney Todd which subsequently transferred to Broadway, Ying Tong – A Walk with the Goons, Someone Who'll Watch Over Me, Journey's End and the world première of Kate Betts' On the Third Day which won the Channel 4 television series The Play's the Thing. In 2006, the theatre played host to the landmark revival of Peter Hall's production of Waiting for Godot which ran for a strictly limited autumn season.

Recent productions include the Menier Chocolate Factory production of Little Shop of Horrors, the Bush Theatre's production of Whipping it Up, starring Richard Wilson and Robert Bathurst, and Love Song, starring Cillian Murphy and Neve Campbell (November 2006 to February 2007).

Nearby Tube stations 

 Leicester Square
 Covent Garden

References 

 Guide to British Theatres 1750–1950, John Earl and Michael Sell pp. 98 (Theatres Trust, 2000)

External links 

 Theatre History

West End theatres
Grade II listed buildings in the City of Westminster
Theatres completed in 1913
Theatres in the City of Westminster
1913 establishments in England